Idomenae or Idomenai (possibly from Ἰδομενεύς - Idomeneues), also known as Idomene (Ἰδομένη), or Eidomenae or Eidomenai, or Idomenia, was a town of ancient Macedonia.

Sitalces, king of Thrace, on his route from Thrace to Macedonia, crossed Mount Cercine, leaving the Paeones on his right, and the Sinti and Maedi on his left, and descended upon the long river Axius at Idomenae. Sitalces and his troops destroyed Idomenae in 429 B.C.

It is described by Ptolemy as being within the province of Emathia, and was near Doberus, next to which it is named by Hierocles among the towns of Consular Macedonia under the Byzantine Empire. Idomenae is documented from the 5th century BCE.

It is now an archaeological site located near the village of Marvinci, near Valandovo, modern-day North Macedonia.

Archaeology
At its beginning, Idomenae was about 5,000 km2 big. An acropolis with defensive walls was built, a pottery building was also built, and so were other buildings. The people in this town traded a lot with the Asia Minor, which is evidenced by the facts that much of the material found on pottery here was used in graves in Asia Minor. There are also many amphoras from the islands of Thassos and Rhodes.

References

Archaeological sites in North Macedonia
Former populated places in the Balkans
Populated places in ancient Macedonia
Geography of ancient Paeonia
Valandovo Municipality